Katarina Cohen (born 26 June 1975) is a Swedish actress.  She is best known for her role as Josefin in the TV-series Glappet.

Cohen graduated from the Theaterschool in Stockholm in 2002.

Filmography
1996 – Lögn
1997 – Glappet
1999 – Jakten på en mördare 
2002 – Suxxess
2002 – Rederiet 
2003 – Järnvägshotellet 
2004 – Kvarteret skatan
2005–2010 – Jonson och Pipen 
2006 – Göta kanal 2 – Kanalkampen
2010 – Tusen gånger starkare
2010 – Fröken Märkvärdig & karriären
2011 – Gengångare
2012 – Isdraken
2012 – Arne Dahl: Upp till toppen av berget
2013 – Lutningen

References

Swedish television actresses
Living people
1975 births
20th-century Swedish actresses
21st-century Swedish actresses
Place of birth missing (living people)